Isaac Elishakoff is a Distinguished Research Professor in the Ocean and Mechanical Engineering Department in the Florida Atlantic University, Boca Raton, Florida. He is an authoritative figure in the broad area of mechanics. He has made several contributions in the areas of random vibrations, solid mechanics of composite material, semi-inverse problems of vibrations and stability, functionally graded material structures, and nanotechnology.

He has over 580 journal papers, 32 authored, co-authored, edited or co-edited books and has given over 200 national and international talks at conferences and seminars.

His selected lectures on (a) Elastic Stability, (b) Vibration Syntheses and Analysis and (c) Intermediate Strength of Materials are available on the internet.

In 2021, Elishakoff received Blaise Pascal Medal in Engineering from the European Academy of Sciences, “to recognise an outstanding and demonstrated personal contribution to science and technology and the promotion of excellence in research and education.” He was simultaneously  elected as a Fellow of the European Academy of Sciences. At the award ceremony he lectured on “Uncertainty Analysis in Engineering: From Blaise Pascal and Pierre Fermat to Modern Times.”

National and international recognitions 
Frank M. Freimann Visiting Chair Professorship, University of Notre Dame, United States 1985/86
Henry J. Massman Jr. Visiting Chair Professorship, University of Notre Dame, Fall Semester, United States, 1986/87 (inaugural holder)
Fellow of American Academy of Mechanics, 1991 ("For outstanding achievements and pioneering contributions in random vibrations”.)
Visiting Castiliagno Distinguished Professorship, University of Palermo, Italy 1992
Fellow of Japan Society for Promotion of Science, University of Tokyo, Japan 1992
ASME Distinguished Lectureship (1996–2002)
Visiting W.T. Koiter Chair Professorship, Delft University of Technology 2000 (inaugural holder)
Visiting Professorship, Sapienza University of Rome, Rome, Italy 2005, 2010, 2017
Fellow of Japan Society for Promotion of Science, Kyoto University, Japan (2006–2007)
Visiting Eminent Scholar, Beijing University of Aeronautics & Astronautics, P.R. China (2007, 2009, 2010)
Foreign Member, Georgian National Academy of Sciences (“For seminal contributions to the theoretical and applied mechanics”) (2010)
Member, European Academy of Sciences and Arts (2011)
Fellow, ASME (2011)
Visiting Distinguished Fellow, Royal Academy of Engineering, United Kingdom (2015)
Worcester Reed Warner Medal, American Society of Mechanical Engineers, 2016
Visiting Distinguished Professor, Faculty of Civil and Environmental Engineering, Technion – Israel Institute of Technology, 2014–2018
In 2019 he was awarded the William B. Johnson Inter-Professional Founders Award “In recognition for a lifetime achievement of accomplishments in applied mechanics research and instruction which affect world-wide advancement of business, culture, and learning”, by the Engineers Council.
In 2019 he served as the S. P. Timoshenko Visiting Scholar at the Department of Mechanical Engineering, Stanford University.

Special symposium 
ASME International Congress and Exposition, Lake Buena Vista, FL. Nov. 2009; special “Symposium on Stability, Structural Reliability, and Random Vibrations in Honor of Prof. Isaac Elishakoff” with 3 keynote lectures and 18 contributed lectures by authors of 12 countries (2009)
"International Journal of Structural Stability and Dynamics" published a special issue, Vol. 11, number 4, in Honor of Prof. I. Elishakoff (2011)

Books 
I. Elishakoff, Probabilistic Methods in the Theory of Structures, Wiley‑Interscience, New York, 1983, XII + pp. 489; .
Yakov Ben‑Haim and I. Elishakoff, Convex Models of Uncertainty in Applied Mechanics, Elsevier Science Publishers, Amsterdam, 1990, XVII + pp. 221; .
Gabriel Cederbaum, I. Elishakoff, Jacob Aboudi and Liviu Librescu, Random Vibration and Reliability of Composite Structures, Technomic, Lancaster, 1992, XIII + pp. 191; .
I. Elishakoff, Yukweng Lin and Liping Zhu, Probabilistic and Convex Modeling of Acoustically Excited Structures, Elsevier Science Publishers, Amsterdam, 1994, VIII + pp. 296; .
Elishakoff I, Probabilistic Theory of Structures, Dover Publications, Mineola, New York, 1999, XVI + pp. 492; 
Elishakoff, Yiwei Li and James H. Starnes, Jr., Non‑Classical Problems in the Theory of Elastic Stability, Cambridge University Press, 2001, XVI +pp. 336; .
Elishakoff and Yongjian Ren, Large Variation Finite Element Method for Stochastic Problems, Oxford University Press, 2003, IX + pp. 260; .
I. Elishakoff, Safety Factors and Reliability: Friends or Foes?, Kluwer Academic Publishers, Dordrecht, 2004, X + pp. 295; .
I. Elishakoff, Eigenvalues of Inhomogeneous Structures:  Unusual Closed-Form Solutions of Semi-Inverse Problems, CRC Press, Boca Raton, 2005, XIV + pp. 729; .
I. Elishakoff and Makoto Ohsaki, Optimization and Anti-Optimization of Structures under Uncertainty, Imperial College Press, London, 2010, XV+ pp. 402; .
I. Elishakoff, D. Pentaras, K. Dujat, C. Versaci, G. Muscolino, J. Storch, S. Bucas, N. Challamel, T. Natsuki, Y.Y. Zhang, C.M. Wang and G. Ghyselinck, Carbon Nanotubes and Nano Sensors: Vibrations, Buckling, and Ballistic Impact, ISTE-Wiley, London, 2012, XIII+pp. 421;.
I. Elishakoff, Resolution of Twentieth Century Conundrum in Elastic Stability, World Scientific/Imperial College Press, Singapore, 2014; pp. 333, .
I. Elishakoff, D. Pentaras and C. Gentilini, Mechanics of Functionally Graded Material Structures, World Scientific/Imperial College Press, Singapore; pp. 323, 2015.
I. Elishakoff, Probabilistic Methods in the Theory of Structures: Random Strength of Materials, Random Vibration, and Buckling, World Scientific, Singapore, 2017.
I. Elishakoff, Solution Manual to Accompany Probabilistic Methods in the Theory of Structures: Problems with Complete, Worked Through Solutions, World Scientific, Singapore, 2018.
I. Elishakoff,  Handbook on Timoshenko-Ehrenfest Beam and Uflyand-Mindlin Plate Theories, World Scientific, Singapore,, 2019.
I. Elishakoff,  Dramatic Effect of Cross-Correlations in Random Vibrations of Discrete Systems, Beams, Plates, and Shells , Springer, Nature, Switzerland, ISBN 978---3-030-40394-2, 2020.
V. Raizer and I. Elishakoff, Philosophies of Structural Safety and Reliability, Taylor & Francis, Boca Raton, Hb: 978-1-032-20930-1, 2022.
I.Elishakoff,Fair Share:111 Problems in Division from Ahmes to Aumann,Springer in Press,2023.

Edited Volumes 

I. Elishakoff and Richard H. Lyon, (editors), Random Vibration‑Status and Recent Developments, Elsevier Science Publishers, Amsterdam, 1986, XX + pp. 565; .
I. Elishakoff and Horst Irretier, (editors), Refined Dynamical Theories of Beams, Plates and Shels and their Applications, Springer Verlag, Berlin, 1987, XII + pp. 436; .
I. Elishakoff, Johann Arbocz, Charles D. Babcock, Jr. and Avinoam Libai, (editors), Buckling of Structures‑Theory and Experiment, Elsevier Science Publishers, Amsterdam, 1988, XX + pp. 449; .
T. Ariaratnam, Gerhart Schuëller, and I. Elishakoff, (editors), Stochastic Structural Dynamics‑Progress in Theory and Applications, Elsevier Applied Science Publishers, London, 1988, XX + pp. 375; .
Chuh Mei, Howard F. Wolfe and I. Elishakoff, (editors), Vibration and Behavior of Composite Structures, ASME Press, New York, 1989, V + pp. 73; .
Fabio Casciati, I. Elishakoff, and J. Brian Roberts, (editors), Nonlinear Structural Systems under Random Conditions, Elsevier Science Publishers, Amsterdam, 1990, pp. 386; .
Ahmed K. Noor, I. Elishakoff and Greg Hulbert, (editors), Symbolic Computations and Their Impact on Mechanics, ASME Press, New York, 1990, XV + pp. 376; .
David Hui and I. Elishakoff, (editors), Impact and Buckling of Structures, ASME Press, New York, 1990, V + pp. 99; .
Y.K. Lin and I. Elishakoff, (editors), Stochastic Structural Dynamics 1‑New Theoretical Developments, Springer, Berlin, 1991, XIII + pp. 346; .
I. Elishakoff and Y. K. Lin, (editors), Stochastic Structural Dynamics 2 ‑ New Applications, Springer, Berlin, 1991, XIII + pp. 351; .
I. Elishakoff (editor), Whys and Hows in Uncertainty Modeling, Springer, Vienna, 1999, VII + pp. 393, .
Alexander P. Seyranian and I. Elishakoff (editors), Modern Problems of Structural Stability, Springer, Vienna, 2002, III + pp. 394, .
I. Elishakoff (editor), Mechanical Vibration: Where Do We Stand, Springer, Vienna, 2007, IV + pp. 488, .
I. Elishakoff and C. Soize (editors), Non-Deterministic Mechanics, Springer, Vienna, 2012, II+ pp. 356, .

International leadership 

In 1986, Dr. I. Elishakoff co-organized the European Mechanics Colloquium on "Refined Dynamical Theories of Beams, Plates and Shells, and Their Applications" in Kassel, Federal Republic of Germany.
In 1990 he co-organized the Second International Conference on Stochastic Structural Dynamics, in Boca Raton, Florida.
In 1990, he co-organized the Symposium on "Symbolic Computations and Their Impact on Mechanics" at the 111th Winter Annual Meeting of the ASME, in Dallas, TX.
In 1992, he co-organized a joint FAU-University of Federal Armed Forces-Hamburg (FRG) Conference on "Recent Developments in Solid Mechanics".
In 1996 he organized an "International Conference on Uncertain Structures" in Miami and the Western Caribbean.
In 1997 he coordinated a special course, "Uncertainty in Engineering Probability, Fuzziness and Anti-Optimization" in the International Centre for Mechanical Sciences (CISM), in Udine, Italy, within its Hertz Session. He also has organized numerous sessions at national and international meetings worldwide, including the sessions at the ASME meetings.
In 2001 he co-organized a special course, "Stability of Structures: Modern Problems and Unconventional Solutions” at CISM, Udine, Italy, Europe.
In 2005, he organized a special course “Mechanical Vibrations: Where Do We Stand?” at CISM, Udine, Italy, Europe.
In 2011 he co-organized a special course in “Nondeterministic Mechanics”, at CISM, Udine, Italy, Europe.

Volumes Dedicated to I. Elishakoff 

In 2021, Professors Noel Challamel (University of South Brittany, France), Julius Kaplunov (University of Keele, United Kingdom) and Izuru Takewaki (Kyoto University, Japan) edited three books titled, Modern Trends in Structural and Solid Mechanics, in honor of Isaac Elishakoff, with volumes:
Vol. 1 Statics and Stability,
Vol. 2 Vibrations,
Vol. 3 Non-Deterministic Mechanics.

First Homeland Security Engineering Course 

In addition to extensive research he has developed numerous undergraduate and graduate courses, including apparently the first engineering course worldwide “Design for Homeland Security” (see his paper “Apparently first engineering course in homeland safety and security worldwide,” International Journal of Safety and Security in Engineering, Vol.3(4),333-338, 2014).

Passion for Teaching: Response to Stephen Colbert 

Here is a quote on the quadratic formula from I Am America (And So Can You!) by Stephen Colbert:

“Let’s try a little experiment. Look at this equation:

What you are feeling right now, is your body rejecting an idea that is trying to make you learn it. Don’t fight the confusion. That’s just your mind scabbing over in a desperate attempt to protect you from that unnatural commingling of numbers and letters up there. You can’t add it, and you can’t read it. Useless.”

Elishakoff  wrote an extensive response to Mr. Colbert’s statements. Likewise, he described differential equations of love in order to promote  love of differential equations by undergraduate students. As of February 1, 2023, these papers have been downloaded 14,230 times. With J. N. Reddy, Elishakoff has written on solving quadratic equations without resorting to quadratic formula.

Passion for History 

Additional passion of Elishakoff is history of science. In recent years he published several revelatory articles  about Stephen P. Timoshenko (1878-1972), famous author of numerous textbooks in applied mechanics. The article “ Stepan Prokofievich Timoshenko and America” became one of the most downloaded articles of The Journal of Applied Mathematics and Mechanics, also known as Zeitschrift für Angewandte Mathematik und Mechanik or ZAMM, during years 2018/19.

References 

People from Kutaisi
20th-century American Jews
1944 births
Florida Atlantic University faculty
American mechanical engineers
Living people
Fellows of the American Institute of Aeronautics and Astronautics
21st-century American Jews